Alan La Madrid Purisima  (born November 21, 1959)  is a former Filipino police officer. He served as Philippine National Police Chief between December 17, 2012 and February 5, 2015.

Early life
Purisima grew up in San Ildefonso, Ilocos Sur.

He was the executive officer of the Special Reaction Unit from 1988–1989.

Education
After finishing high school, Purisima entered the Philippine Military Academy in 1977 and graduated from the academy in 1981. After his graduation from military academy he joined the Philippine Constabulary. He graduated from the Manuel L. Quezon University in 1995. He earned a Masters of Public Administration degree from the university.

Dismissal
On June 30, 2015, he was dismissed from service by the Office of the Ombudsman over the alleged involvement in a ₱100-million anomalous deal between the Philippine National Police and WerFast Documentary Agency, Inc, a private courier company.

Personal life
Alan Purisima is married to Maria Ramona Lydia Isidoro Purisima, with whom he has four sons.

References

Filipino police chiefs
Living people
1959 births
People from Ilocos Sur
Philippine Military Academy alumni
Manuel L. Quezon University alumni
Philippine Military Academy Class of 1981
Benigno Aquino III administration personnel